Yolla may refer to:

 Yolla gas field, Bass Strait, Australia
 Yolla, Tasmania, Australia
 Yolla District High School
 Yolla Football Club
 Yolla, Tasmanian Aboriginal word for short-tailed shearwater
 Yolla Bolly-Middle Eel Wilderness, wilderness area west of Red Bluff, California, United States
 Yolla Yuliana, Indonesian women volleyball player
 Yolla, iOS and Android app for international calls
 Yowlah (also spelled "yolla"), a traditional dance of the United Arab Emirates and Oman